Elachista graeca is a moth of the family Elachistidae that is found in Greece and Croatia.

References

graeca
Moths described in 2002
Moths of Europe